"He's the King" is a song recorded by Welsh singer Bonnie Tyler for her twelfth studio album, All in One Voice (1998). It was released in December 1997 by EastWest Records as the lead single of the album. The song was written by German songwriters Harold Faltermeyer and Gernot Rothenbach.

"He's the King" charted at number 95 in the German Top 100 Singles Chart, released a year before the album. The song appeared on the 1997 German film , where Tyler can be seen performing the song in a nightclub. It was also featured on the film's soundtrack.

Background
The song was recorded at the Red Deer Studio in Berlin.

Track listing
"He's the King" was released on a maxi CD in December 1997. Tyler's vocals do not feature on this track.
"He's the King (Radio Version)" – 3:45
"He's The King (Extended Version)" – 4:43
"He's The King (Acoustic Mix)" – 4:12
"Der König von St. Pauli (Theme)" – 3:55

Chart performance

Credits and personnel
Credits and personnel adapted from album liner notes.

Bonnie Tyler – lead vocals
Harold Faltermeyer – writer, producer, keyboards, accordion
Gernot Rothenbach – writer, producer
Wesley Plass – electric guitar
Andreas Linse – keyboards
Miriam Stockley – backing vocalist
Tessa Niles – backing vocalist
Lance Ellington – backing vocalist

References

Bonnie Tyler songs
1997 singles
1997 songs